The North Dakota Fighting Hawks volleyball team is a part of the athletic program at the University of North Dakota in Grand Forks, North Dakota, USA. They are members of the NCAA Division I Summit League. The program only includes a women's team. The current head coach is Jeremiah Tiffin.

Head coaches

(* – interim)

Championships
North Dakota has won 2 Regular Season Championships and 5 Conference Tournament Championships

 Great West Conference
Conference Tournament Champions (3 times): 2009, 2010, 2011 Big Sky Conference
Regular Season Champions (2 times): 2013, 2016
Conference Tournament Champions (2 times): 2016, 2017

Postseason

Division 1 Postseason Results

Arenas
Hyslop Sports Center 1976–2003
Betty Engelstad Sioux Center 2004–present

See also
List of NCAA Division I women's volleyball programs

References

External links